The Penfield Central School District is a public school district in New York State that serves approximately 4,600 students in portions of the towns of Penfield, Brighton, Perinton and Pittsford in Monroe County, and Macedon and Walworth in Wayne County, with approximately 900 employees and an operating budget of $102.6 million (~ $21,445 per student).

The average class size is 23 for grades K–2, 24 for grades 3–5, and 25 for grades 6–12.

Schools

Elementary schools (K-5)
Cobbles Elementary School, Principal - Stephen Kenny
Harris Hill Elementary School, Principal - Marc Nelson
Indian Landing Elementary School, Principal - Marcie Ware
Scribner Road Elementary School, Principal - Scott L. Hirschler

Middle school (6-8)
Bay Trail Middle School, Principal - Winton Buddington

High school (9-12)
Penfield High School, Principal - Leslie Maloney

References

External links

New York State School Boards Association

School districts in New York (state)
Education in Monroe County, New York
School districts established in 1948